Mansplaining (a blend word of man and the informal form splaining of the gerund explaining) is a pejorative term meaning (of a man) "to comment on or explain something to a woman in a condescending, overconfident, and often inaccurate or oversimplified manner".
Author Rebecca Solnit ascribed the phenomenon to a combination of "overconfidence and cluelessness". Lily Rothman, of The Atlantic, defined it as "explaining without regard to the fact that the explainee knows more than the explainer, often done by a man to a woman".

In its original use, mansplaining differed from other forms of condescension in that it was said to be rooted in the assumption that a man is likely to be more knowledgeable than a woman. However, it has come to be used more broadly, often applied when a man takes a condescending tone in an explanation to anyone, regardless of the age or gender of the intended recipients: a "man 'splaining" can be delivered to any audience. In 2010, it was named by the New York Times as one of its "Words of the Year". American Dialect Society nominated Mansplaining as the “most creative” new word in 2012.

Origins 
The verb splain has been in use for more than 200 years, originally as a colloquial pronunciation of the Late Middle English word explain. It came increasingly to refer to condescending or verbose explanations. The term mansplaining was inspired by an essay, "Men Explain Things to Me: Facts Didn't Get in Their Way", written by Rebecca Solnit and published on TomDispatch.com on 13 April 2008. In the essay, Solnit told an anecdote about a man at a party who said he had heard she had written some books. She began to talk about her most recent, on Eadweard Muybridge, whereupon the man cut her off and asked if she had "heard about the very important Muybridge book that came out this year"—not considering that it might be (as, in fact, it was) Solnit's book. Solnit did not use the word mansplaining in the essay, but she described the phenomenon as "something every woman knows".

A month later the word appeared in a comment on the social network LiveJournal. It became popular among feminist bloggers before entering mainstream commentary. The word was included in 2010 by the New York Times as one of its words of the year, nominated in 2012 for the American Dialect Society's "most creative word of the year" honor, and added in 2014 to the online Oxford Dictionaries.

Solnit later published Men Explain Things to Me (2014), a collection of seven essays on similar themes. Women, including professionals and experts, are routinely seen or treated as less credible than men, she wrote in the title essay, and their insights, or even legal testimony are dismissed unless validated by a man in some countries. She argued that this was one symptom of a widespread phenomenon that "keeps women from speaking up and from being heard when they dare; that crushes young women into silence by indicating, the way harassment on the street does, that this is not their world. It trains us in self-doubt and self-limitation just as it exercises men's unsupported overconfidence."

In 2018, during a lecture at Moe's Books in Berkeley, California, Solnit said, "I'm falsely credited with coining the term 'mansplaining'. It was a 2010 New York Times word of the year. I did not actually coin it. I was a bit ambivalent about the word because it seems a little bit more condemnatory of the male of the species than I ever wanted it to be."

Usage 
Journalists have used the word to describe the 2012 Republican presidential nominee, Mitt Romney; President Donald Trump; Governor of Texas Rick Perry; MSNBC host Lawrence O'Donnell; various characters on the HBO drama series The Newsroom; music executive Jimmy Iovine; Australian Prime Minister Malcolm Turnbull; actor Matt Damon; and consumer rights advocate Ralph Nader. In February 2016 the term sparked an argument between two members of a committee of the Australian Senate, when Labor senator Katy Gallagher told Communications Minister Mitch Fifield: "I love the mansplaining. I'm enjoying it."

In 2013 Dictionary.com said it was adding both mansplain and the suffix (libfix) -splain to its dictionary. Its announcement read in part: "In addition to being creative, this term, particularly the -splaining part, has proven to be incredibly robust and useful as a combining form in 2013." Dictionary.com noted that the meaning of mansplain had changed somewhat since 2009, from "intense and serious to casual and jocular", while older -splain words still have "heavy cultural and political connotations and are often added to the names of politicians".

Mansplaining has also engendered parallel constructions such as womansplaining, whitesplaining, rightsplaining, goysplaining, and Damonsplaining.

Criticism 

MPR News Staff disputed the usefulness of the term. Given its gender-specific nature and negative connotation, Lesley Kinzel described it as inherently biased, essentialist, dismissive, and a double standard. In a 2016 Washington Post article, Cathy Young wrote that it is just one of a number of terms using "man" as a derogatory prefix, and that this convention is part of a "current cycle of misandry". Meghan Daum, in a 2015 Los Angeles Times article, wrote that "To suggest that men are more qualified for the designation than women is not only sexist but almost as tone deaf as categorizing everything that a man says as mansplaining." In 2014 Solnit herself said she had doubts about it: "[I]t seems to me to go a little heavy on the idea that men are inherently flawed this way, rather than that some men explain things they shouldn't and don't hear things they should." As the word became more popular, several commentators complained that misappropriation had diluted its original meaning. Joshua Sealy-Harrington and Tom McLaughlin wrote  in newspaper The Globe and Mail that the term has been used as an ad hominem to silence debate.

See also 
Himpathy
 Ad Hominem (Circumstantial)
 Manosphere
 Manspreading 
 Manterrupting
 Sociolinguistics
 Tone policing
 Teaching grandmother to suck eggs, a gender-neutral idiom for a similar phenomenon
 Westsplaining

References

External links 

 Rebecca Solnit, Men Explain Things to Me; Facts Didn't Get in Their Way, 13 April 2008
 Lara Rutherford-Morrison (Bustle), 6 Subtle Forms Of Mansplaining That Women Encounter Each Day, 19 Jan 2016

Pejorative terms for men
Sexism
Sociolinguistics
2000s neologisms